Lysophosphatidylserine is a lysophospholipid which triggers TLR 2.

A recent study showed that it does not stimulate normal leukocytes.  It also enhances glucose transport, lowering blood glucose levels while leaving secretion of insulin unaffected.

References

External links 
 

G protein-coupled receptors